Calliostoma tsuchiyai is a species of sea snail, a marine gastropod mollusk in the family Calliostomatidae.

Notes
Additional information regarding this species:
 Taxonomic remark: Some authors place this taxon in the subgenus Calliostoma (Tristichotrochus).

Distribution
This marine species occurs off Japan.

References

 Higo, S., Callomon, P. & Goto, Y. (1999). Catalogue and bibliography of the marine shell-bearing Mollusca of Japan. Osaka. : Elle Scientific Publications. 749 pp.

External links
 To Encyclopedia of Life
 To World Register of Marine Species

tsuchiyai
Gastropods described in 1971